MS Windward was a cruise ship that was built in 1993 by the Chantiers de l'Atlantique shipyard in St. Nazaire, France for Kloster Cruise (Norwegian Cruise Line) as Windward. In 1998 she was lengthened at Lloyd Werft in Bremerhaven, Germany and renamed Norwegian Wind. In 2007 she was transferred to the fleet of Star Cruises as SuperStar Aquarius. The ship remained in passenger service for the cruise line until the COVID-19 pandemic shutdown in 2020. The ship was sold for scrap as Arius in 2022 following the liquidation of the cruise line's parent company after filing for bankruptcy, which also led to the demise of Star Cruises.

History

Entering service in 1993 as Windward, she was the second of two sister vessels built by Chantiers de l'Atlantique for Kloster Cruise for use under their Norwegian Cruise Line brand. In 1998 she was lengthened by insertion of a  midsection and was renamed as Norwegian Wind. This work was completed by Lloyd Werft shipyard in Bremerhaven, Germany.

One of her early cruises was a private charter for Prudential Assurance of the UK. In January 1995 a 5-day cruise of the Caribbean was undertaken for the top 350 salespeople in the UK Direct Sales Force and their partners. For the booking the cruise liner had additional wording placed below her name on hull and funnel – 'Salute to the Stars'  (The Prudential Sales force competition).

In 2004 ownership of Norwegian Wind was transferred to NCL's parent company Star Cruises, in anticipation of transference of the ship to the Star Cruises' fleet. The transfer took place in April 2007, when the ship was renamed SuperStar Aquarius.  After refitting and refurbishment of the public areas to cater to the Asia-Pacific market, as well as a new livery to match the rest of the Star Cruises fleet, the vessel was initially based at the Ocean Terminal, Hong Kong. Subsequently, she was based at various ports in the region. The ship continued to sail for the cruise line until early 2020 when the COVID-19 pandemic halted the cruise line industry, and in April was, with SuperStar Gemini, leased to the Singapore Government to provide accommodation for foreign workers who had recovered from COVID-19.

In January 2022, Genting Hong Kong, the parent company of Star Cruises filed for bankruptcy caused by the shutdown. In June the ship was laid up with SuperStar Gemini at Hambantota, Sri Lanka, until both ships departed for Alang shipbreaking yard, India, where they were beached on 26 November 2022.

References

External links

 Star Cruises 
 SuperStar Aquarius

Ships of Norwegian Cruise Line
Ships of Star Cruises
Ships built in France
1992 ships
Ships built by Chantiers de l'Atlantique